Hugo Gernsback (born Hugo Gernsbacher, August 16, 1884 – August 19, 1967) was a Luxembourgish–American editor and magazine publisher, whose publications included the first science fiction magazine, Amazing Stories. His contributions to the genre as publisher were so significant that, along with the novelists H. G. Wells and Jules Verne, he is sometimes called "The Father of Science Fiction". In his honor, annual awards presented at the World Science Fiction Convention are named the "Hugos".

Personal life 
Gernsback was born in 1884 in Luxembourg City, to Berta (Dürlacher), a housewife, and Moritz Gernsbacher, a winemaker. His family was Jewish. Gernsback emigrated to the United States in 1904 and later became a naturalized citizen. He married three times: to Rose Harvey in 1906, Dorothy Kantrowitz in 1921, and Mary Hancher in 1951. In 1925, he founded radio station WRNY, which was broadcast from the 18th floor of the Roosevelt Hotel in New York City. In 1928, WRNY aired some of the first television broadcasts. During the show, audio stopped and each artist waved or bowed onscreen. When audio resumed, they performed. Gernsback is also considered a pioneer in amateur radio.

Before helping to create science fiction, Gernsback was an entrepreneur in the electronics industry, importing radio parts from Europe to the United States and helping to popularize amateur "wireless". In April 1908 he founded Modern Electrics, the world's first magazine about both electronics and radio, called "wireless" at the time. While the cover of the magazine itself states it was a catalog, most historians note that it contained articles, features, and plotlines, qualifying it as a magazine.

Under its auspices, in January 1909, he founded the Wireless Association of America, which had 10,000 members within a year. In 1912, Gernsback said that he estimated 400,000 people in the U.S. were involved in amateur radio. In 1913, he founded a similar magazine, The Electrical Experimenter, which became Science and Invention in 1920. It was in these magazines that he began including scientific fiction stories alongside science journalism, including his novel Ralph 124C 41+, which he ran for 12 months from April 1911 in Modern Electrics.

Hugo Gernsback started the Radio News magazine for amateur radio enthusiasts in 1919.

He died at Roosevelt Hospital (Mount Sinai West as of 2020) in New York City on August 19, 1967, at age 83.

Science fiction

Gernsback provided a forum for the modern genre of science fiction in 1926 by founding the first magazine dedicated to it, Amazing Stories. The inaugural April issue comprised a one-page editorial and reissues of six stories, three less than ten years old and three by Poe, Verne, and Wells. He said he became interested in the concept after reading a translation of the work of Percival Lowell as a child. His idea of a perfect science fiction story was "75 percent literature interwoven with 25 percent science". He also played an important role in starting science fiction fandom, by organizing the Science Fiction League and by publishing the addresses of people who wrote letters to his magazines. Fans began to organize, and became aware of themselves as a movement, a social force; this was probably decisive for the subsequent history of the genre.

Gernsback coined the term "science fiction" in 1929. His preferred term for the genre was scientifiction.

In 1929, he lost ownership of his first magazines after a bankruptcy lawsuit. There is some debate about whether this process was genuine, manipulation by publisher Bernarr Macfadden, or a Gernsback scheme to begin another company. After losing control of Amazing Stories, Gernsback founded two new science fiction magazines, Science Wonder Stories and Air Wonder Stories. A year later, due to Depression-era financial troubles, the two were merged into Wonder Stories, which Gernsback continued to publish until 1936, when it was sold to Thrilling Publications and renamed Thrilling Wonder Stories. Gernsback returned in 1952–53 with Science-Fiction Plus.

Gernsback was noted for sharp, sometimes shady, business practices, and for paying his writers extremely low fees or not paying them at all. H. P. Lovecraft and Clark Ashton Smith referred to him as "Hugo the Rat".

Barry Malzberg has said:

Gernsback's venality and corruption, his sleaziness and his utter disregard for the financial rights of authors, have been well documented and discussed in critical and fan literature. That the founder of genre science fiction who gave his name to the field's most prestigious award and who was the Guest of Honor at the 1952 Worldcon was pretty much a crook (and a contemptuous crook who stiffed his writers but paid himself $100K a year as President of Gernsback Publications) has been clearly established. 

Jack Williamson, who had to hire an attorney associated with the American Fiction Guild to force Gernsback to pay him, summed up his importance for the genre:

At any rate, his main influence in the field was simply to start Amazing and Wonder Stories and get SF out to the public newsstands—and to name the genre he had earlier called "scientifiction."

Fiction 
Frederik Pohl said in 1965 that Gernsback's Amazing Stories published "the kind of stories Gernsback himself used to write: a sort of animated catalogue of gadgets". Gernsback's fiction includes the novel Ralph 124C 41+; the title is a pun on the phrase "one to foresee for many" ("one plus"). Even though Ralph 124C 41+ has been described as pioneering many ideas and themes found in later SF work, it has often been neglected due to what most critics deem poor artistic quality. Author Brian Aldiss called the story a "tawdry illiterate tale" and a "sorry concoction", while author and editor Lester del Rey called it "simply dreadful." While most other modern critics have little positive to say about the story's writing, Ralph 124C 41+ is considered by science fiction critic Gary Westfahl as "essential text for all studies of science fiction."

Gernsback's second novel, Baron Münchausen's Scientific Adventures, was serialized in Amazing Stories in 1928.

Gernsback's third (and final) novel, Ultimate World, written c. 1958, was not published until 1971. Lester del Rey described it simply as "a bad book", marked more by routine social commentary than by scientific insight or extrapolation. James Blish, in a caustic review, described the novel as "incompetent, pedantic, graceless, incredible, unpopulated and boring" and concluded that its publication "accomplishes nothing but the placing of a blot on the memory of a justly honored man."

Gernsback combined his fiction and science into Everyday Science and Mechanics magazine, serving as the editor in the 1930s.

Legacy 
In 1954, Gernsback was awarded an Officer of Luxembourg's Order of the Oak Crown, an honor equivalent to being knighted.
 
The Hugo Awards or "Hugos" are the annual achievement awards presented at the World Science Fiction Convention, selected in a process that ends with vote by current Convention members. They originated and acquired the "Hugo" nickname during the 1950s and were formally defined as a convention responsibility under the name "Science Fiction Achievement Awards" early in the 1960s. The nickname soon became almost universal and its use legally protected; "Hugo Award(s)" replaced the longer name in all official uses after the 1991 cycle.

In 1960 Gernsback received a special Hugo Award as "The Father of Magazine Science Fiction".

The Science Fiction and Fantasy Hall of Fame inducted him in 1996, its inaugural class of two deceased and two living persons.

Science fiction author Brian W. Aldiss held a contrary view about Gernsback's contributions: "It is easy to argue that Hugo Gernsback ... was one of the worst disasters to hit the science fiction field ... Gernsback himself was utterly without any literary understanding. He created dangerous precedents which many later editors in the field followed."

The 2010 video game Mass Effect 2 contains a level involving a downed space charter that bears his name.

Influence in radio electronics and broadcasting 

Gernsback made significant contributions to the growth of early broadcasting, mostly through his efforts as a publisher. He originated the industry of specialized publications for radio with Modern Electrics and Electrical Experimenter. Later on, and more influentially, he published Radio News, which would have the largest readership among radio magazines in radio broadcasting's formative years. He edited Radio News until 1929. For a short time he hired John F. Rider to be editor. Rider was a former engineer working with the US Army Signal Corps and a radio engineer for Alfred H. Grebe, a radio manufacturer. However, Rider would soon leave Gernsback and form his own publishing company, John F. Rider Publisher, New York around 1931.

Gernsback made use of the magazine to promote his interests, including having his radio station's call letters on the cover starting in 1925. WRNY and Radio News were used to cross-promote each other, with programs on his station often used to discuss articles he had published, and articles in the magazine often covering program activities at WRNY. He also advocated for future directions in innovation and regulation of radio. The magazine contained many drawings and diagrams, encouraging radio listeners of the 1920s to experiment themselves to improve the technology. WRNY was often used as a laboratory to see if various radio inventions were worthwhile.

Articles that were published about television were also tested in this manner when the radio station was used to send pictures to experimental television receivers in August 1928. The technology, however, required sending sight and sound one after the other rather than sending both at the same time, as WRNY only broadcast on one channel. Such experiments were expensive, eventually contributing to Gernsback's Experimenter Publishing Company going into bankruptcy in 1929. WRNY was sold to Aviation Radio, who maintained the channel part-time to broadcast aviation weather reports and related feature programs. Along with other stations sharing the same frequency, it was acquired by Metro-Goldwyn-Mayer and consolidated into that company's WHN in 1934.

List of magazines edited or published by Gernsback

 Air Wonder Stories – July 1929 to May 1930, merged with Science Wonder Stories to form Wonder Stories
 Amazing Detective Stories
 Amazing Stories
 Aviation Mechanics
 Electrical Experimenter – 1913 to 1920; became Science and Invention
 Everyday Mechanics – from 1929; changed to Everyday Science and Mechanics as of October 1931 issue
 Everyday Science and Mechanics – see Science and Mechanics
 The Experimenter – originally Practical Electrics, the first issue under this title was November 1924; merged into Science and Invention in 1926
 Facts of Life
 Flight
 Fotocraft
 French Humor – became Tidbits
 Gadgets
 High Seas Adventures
 Know Yourself
 Life Guide
 Light
 Luz
 Milady
 Modern Electrics – 1908 to 1914 (sold in 1913; new owners merged it with Electrician and Mechanic)
 Moneymaking
 Motor Camper & Tourist
 New Ideas for Everybody
 Pirate Stories
 Popular Medicine
 Popular Microscopy – at least thru May–June 1935 (vol 1 #6)
 Practical Electrics – Dec. 1921 to Oct. 1924, became The Experimenter
 Radio Amateur News – July 1919 to July 1920, dropped the word "amateur" and became just Radio News
 Radio and Television
 Radio-Craft — July 1929 to June 1948, became Radio-Electronics
 Radio-Electronics — July 1948 to January 2003
 Radio Electronics Weekly Business Letter
 Radio Listeners Guide and Call Book [title varies]
 Radio News — July 1919 (as Radio Amateur News) to July 1948
 Radio Program Weekly
 Radio Review
 Science and Invention – formerly Electrical Experimenter; published August 1920 to August 1931
 Science and Mechanics – originally Everyday Mechanics; changed to Everyday Science and Mechanics in 1931. "Everyday" dropped as March 1937 issue, and published as Science and Mechanics until 1976
 Science Fiction Plus – March to Dec. 1953
 Science Wonder Stories – June 1929 to May 1930, merged with Air Wonder Stories to form Wonder Stories
 Science Wonder Quarterly – Fall 1929 to Spring 1930, renamed Wonder Stories Quarterly and continuing to Winter 1933
 Scientific Detective Monthly
 Sexologia
 Sexology
 Short-Wave and Television
 Short-Wave Craft – merged into Radio-Craft
 Short-Wave Listener
 Superworld Comics
 Technocracy Review
 Television – 1928
 Television News – March 1931 to October 1932; merged into Radio Review, then into Radio News as of March 1933
 Tidbits, originally French Humor
 Woman's Digest
 Wonder Stories – June 1930 to April 1936
 Your Body
 Your Dreams

Patents
Gernsback held 80 patents by the time of his death in New York City on August 19, 1967.

His first patent was a new method for manufacturing dry-cell batteries, a patent applied for on June 28, 1906, and granted February 5, 1907.

Among his inventions are a combined electric hair brush and comb (US Patent 1,016,138), 1912; an ear cushion (US Patent 1,514,152), 1927; and a hydraulic fishery (US Patent 2,718,083), 1955.

Other patents held by Gernsback are related to: Incandescent Lamp, Electrorheostat Regulator, Electro Adjustable Condenser, Detectorium, Relay, Potentiometer, Electrolytic Interrupter, Rotary Variable Condenser, Luminous Electric Mirror, Transmitter, Postal Card, Telephone Headband, Electromagnetic Sounding Device, Submersible Amusement Device, Apparatus for Landing Flying Machines, Tuned Telephone Receiver, Electric Valve, Detector, Acoustic Apparatus, Electrically Operated Fountain, Cord Terminal, Coil Mounting, Radio Horn, Variable Condenser, Switch, Telephone Receiver, Crystal Detector, Process for Mounting Inductances, Depilator, Code Learner's Instrument.

Bibliography

Novels:

Ralph 124C 41+ (1911)
Baron Münchausen's Scientific Adventures (1928)
Ultimate World (1971)

Short stories:

"The Electric Duel" (1927)
"The Killing Flash (fr)" (1929)
"The Cosmatomic Flyer" Science-Fiction Plus (March 1953)

See also

 List of science fiction editors
 Pulp magazine

Notes

References

Further reading

External links

 
 Radio Before Radio at the web site of the American Radio Relay League
 Gernsback interviewed on Horizon, 1965
 Hugo Gernsback Library & Publications, AmericanRadioHistory.Com

Biography and criticism
 
 "Boys of Wireless" at American Experience (PBS)—Contains information about Gernsback's role in early amateur radio
 Hugo Gernsback, Publisher – discussion of Gernsback as a magazine publisher, with links to cover images of most of his technical and other non-fiction magazines

Bibliography and works
 
 
 Hugo Gernsback Papers – description of his papers in the Special Collections Research Center of the Syracuse University Library

 
1884 births
1967 deaths
20th-century American male writers
20th-century American novelists
People from Luxembourg City
Amateur radio people
American male novelists
American people of Luxembourgian-Jewish descent
American pulp magazine publishers (people)
American radio company founders
American science fiction writers
American speculative fiction editors
American speculative fiction publishers (people)
Luxembourgian emigrants to the United States
Jewish American writers
Luxembourgian inventors
Luxembourgian Jews
Luxembourgian science fiction writers
Science fiction editors
Science Fiction Hall of Fame inductees
Amazing Stories